Abdul Mahmud is a Nigerian lawyer, social critic, columnist, human rights advocate, knowledge worker, essayist, poet, former Students' union leader and activist. He is currently the President, Public Interest Lawyers League (PILL), a body of professional and independent group of lawyers committed to the promotion and enforcement of the rights of vulnerable and minority groups, deepening of democracy and governance and the expansion of public interest law. He is a third-generation Nigerian poet whose works appear under the nom de guerre, Obemata. Some of his poems have also been translated into Polish, Lithuanian and French languages.

Early life, education and activism

Education
Abdul 'Aminu' Mahmud was born in Bauchi, Northeastern Nigeria on 20 November 1968. He was educated at Federal School of Arts and Science, Ondo State and the University of Jos, Plateau State where he obtained his Bachelor of Laws, LL.B (Honours), then proceeded to the Nigeria Law School for his Master of Laws, LL.M.

Student activism and prison
Abdul Mahmud became the President of National Association of Nigerian Students aka NANS in November, 1990, and his leadership and activism led to his abduction and detention by the Department of State Security aka DSS alongside other high-ranking members of the association. Detained alongside him were Bamidele Aturu, Nasir Kura, Chima Okereke, Olatunji Kayode, Bunmi Olusona and Christian Akanni.

Career

Legal practice
He is the Chief Counsel, Ephesis Lex, (Attorneys & Solicitors), Abuja and President of Public Interest Lawyers League (PILL). Prior to that, he was the Senior Legal Executive Tivoli Technology, Stoke Poges, England and served as a Director of Legal Services, Civil Liberties Organization, CLO, Nigeria. He is a Dutch Fellow on Development, Law & Social Justice of International Institute of Social Studies The Hague (class of 1998), and was a Visiting Lecturer in Human Rights Law, Olabisi Onabanjo University, Ogun State. He was a delegate of the 2014 National Conference of Nigeria representing the Civil Society Organizations.

Social commentator
Obemata, his nom de guerre is a regular contributor on legal and public affairs, national and international issues on major national and international print and electronic news media, including The Guardian (Nigeria) newspaper, Daily Times (Nigeria), Channels Television, Africa Independent Television, Radio Nigeria, African Writer Magazine and the Africa Service of the British Broadcasting Corporation and on several online blogs and social media platforms.

Anthologies

Poetry

Self Portrait
For WS, for Breytenbach
In his footsteps
My Heart Whispers, Prometheus
Sunset
Protest Streets
Memoir

Fiction

Chequepoint Charlie

Literary reviews

Lola Shoneyin's Love of Flight
The Legal Framework of Nigeria's Economic Diplomacy: A Review of Nigeria's Economic Diplomacy by Musa Babayo
We Are All Biafrans - A Participant-Observer's Intervention in a Country Sleepwalking to Disaster by Chido Onumah

Selected essays and papers
Audu's Death: Resolving the Legal Conundrum 
Electricity Tariff: What the NERC must do to inspire investors' confidence
Falling Standards in Education and the Crisis of Higher Education in Nigeria
Legal and Administrative Imperatives for the Operation of Political Parties in Nigeria, Abuja, 2013
Making Sense of the Judgment of the Taraba State Election Petition Tribunal
NANS in Our Eyes: The Journey through Time and Space, Kano, 2015
On the Cyber Stalker Near You: The Power of Arrest of the EFCC Examined
Politicians and the Courts are Shackling INEC
The State Digs in Once More: Preliminary Observations on the Transport Sector of the Transformation Agenda, Abuja, 2012

Selected articles

12 Important Guides For Student Activists and Leaders
A Nation of Basket Mouths
Buhari, His Critics and The Case for Efficient Government
Dear Dame, Don't Abuse Kongi
EFCC ill-prepared to handle corruption cases/
Government of Absurdities
Kabiru Mohammed and the falsification of history
Our Mutually Assured Destruction
Why CJN must make assets declaration public

Books
Triptych- A collection of poems
Service Delivery Reports for Most Outstanding Public Institutions in Nigeria (Co-Authored);
Human Rights in Retreat in Nigeria, Report of the Universal Defenders of Democracy, UDD, December, 1994 (Co-authored with Chief Mike Ozekhome, SAN)

Political activities

Delegate, 2014 Nigeria National Conference
Former National Deputy Chairman of Campaign for Democracy(1991-1992)
Former Secretary of Democratic Alternative(1994-1999)
Member, Electoral Reform Expert Group

Selected mentions

Identity Transformation and Identity Politics Under Structural Adjustment in Nigeria
Karen Sorensen in Nigeria on the eve of change: Transition to what?
Civil Rights and Pro-Democracy Groups in and outside Nigeria

References

External links
https://twitter.com/abdulmahmud01

1968 births
Living people
University of Jos alumni
People from Bauchi State
Nigerian human rights activists
20th-century Nigerian lawyers
21st-century Nigerian lawyers
English-language writers from Nigeria